John Coburn (May 25, 1724 - January 20, 1803) was a noted silversmith active from about 1745 to 1790 in Boston, Massachusetts. Coburn was born in York, Maine, and apprenticed circa 1737 to John Edwards in Boston. He is best known for his tea-serving items, and also for silver objects for churches in Massachusetts, Connecticut, and Maine. His work is collected in the Museum of Fine Arts, Boston, and the Yale University Art Gallery.

References 
 American Silver: The Work of Seventeenth and Eighteenth Century Silversmiths, Exhibited at the Museum of Fine Arts, June to November, 1906, Richard Townley Haines Halsey, John Henry Buck, Museum of Fine Arts, Boston, 1906, pages 48–49.
 American Silver of the XVII & XVIII Centuries: A Study Based on the Clearwater Collection, Alphonso Trumpbour Clearwater, Clara Louise Avery, Metropolitan Museum of Art, 1920, page 77. 
 Saucepan, Museum of Fine Arts Boston
 Rootsweb genealogy

American silversmiths